Vrbovo is a village southeast of Ilirska Bistrica in the Inner Carniola region of Slovenia.

The local church is dedicated to the Holy Cross and belongs to the Parish of Ilirska Bistrica.

References

External links
Vrbovo on Geopedia

Populated places in the Municipality of Ilirska Bistrica